The Agus River is a river that flows for  from Lanao Lake to Iligan Bay, Philippines. It cuts through the provinces of Lanao del Sur and Lanao del Norte. Settlements along the banks of the river include the City of Marawi, the Municipality of Linamon and the City of Iligan. It separates into two channels as it drains to Iligan Bay; one going over the Maria Cristina Falls while the other supplies the Tinago Falls. The Agus River's watershed spans about 11,320.00 hectares. In 1992, the National Power Corporation financed the reforestation of the Lake Lanao-Agus River watershed, planting over 1500 hectares of Acacia mangium, Durio zibethinus and other indigenous trees. The canyon carved by the river suggests a short erosional period.

Importance to humans

The lake and the river are used for both commercial and sport fishing, as well as for recreational activities such as boating and swimming. The river in its entirety, however, is not navigable because the current in some areas reaches a velocity of up to thirty miles an hour. The NAPOCOR's hydroelectric project on the Agus River generates 70% of the electricity used in Mindanao due to the hydroelectric plants in the river and Maria Cristina Falls. However, the hydroelectric plants and the requisite regulatory dams have changed the fluctuations of the water level of Lake Lanao, affecting the indigenous people, producing conflicts with the local population.

In Maranao mythology, Lake Lanao once threatened to drown the people of Sebangan with its ever-rising waters. The Archangel Gabriel is thought to have made the Agus river in order to drain the lake.

References

Rivers of the Philippines
Landforms of Lanao del Norte
Landforms of Lanao del Sur